Samuel Benton (1820–1864) was an American attorney, newspaper publisher and politician. He served as a colonel in the Confederate States Army during the American Civil War. He was promoted to brigadier general but died two days later before the notification of his promotion reached him.

Early life
Samuel Benton was born on October 18, 1820, in Williamson County, Tennessee. He was a prominent lawyer in Holly Springs, Mississippi. He was also the publisher of a newspaper, The Mississippi Times; Number I of which appeared in April 1853.

In politics he was an Old Line Whig and in favor of states' rights. He was a member of both the Union Convention of 1855 and the Mississippi Secession Convention of 1861. He served on the Ways and Means Committee at the Secession Convention. In 1852, he served in the Mississippi state legislature.

Civil War
During the American Civil War, Benton enlisted for Mississippi state service in early 1861. He was elected captain in the "Old" 9th Mississippi Infantry, 12 month regiment. In March 1861 the regiment went to Mobile, Alabama, then marched from there to Pensacola, Florida. When the enlistments of the original 9th Regiment soldiers was up, he was made Colonel of the 34th Mississippi Infantry Regiment (known as the 37th Regiment for a short period of time). The Regiment saw its first service under Major General Earl Van Dorn, during his attempt to drive back the Union Army during the movement to Corinth, Mississippi after the Battle of Shiloh. Colonel Benton was commended, as was the regiment for its behavior during the engagement.

Benton and the 34th Mississippi Infantry accompanied General Braxton Bragg's army to Chattanooga, Tennessee in July 1862, then in August joined Major General William J. Hardee's Corps back to Middle Tennessee, into Kentucky, and fought at the Battle of Perryville, Kentucky, where the 34th fought successfully but at great cost. Benton was wounded, and his lieutenant colonel and major were both permanently disabled. Due to his wounds, Benton was absent from the 34th at the Battle of Chickamauga. He was back in command at the Battle of Lookout Mountain, where the regiment was on the picket line at the base of the mountain. The 34th was overrun by four columns of Union infantry, and around 200 men were captured.

In the Atlanta Campaign, Benton commanded the 29th, 30th and 34th Mississippi infantry regiments at the Battle of Alt's Gap, then the 34th in Major General Edward C. Walthall's brigade at the Battle of Resaca. The brigade was flanked by Union artillery, and the war has few if any cases of greater losses (unit-proportional) by artillery fire than Walthall's Brigade at Resaca. But the brigade was immovable and defended the position for both days.

When Major General Walthall was promoted to division command, Col. Benton was given the brigade. At the Battle of Atlanta July 22, 1864, while commanding the brigade, he was severely wounded in the chest by a shell fragment and wounded in the right foot, causing the loss of his leg.

Death and legacy

Benton died six days later in Griffin, Georgia. He died before his promotion to brigadier general, dated two days earlier, reached him. Due to his death, his appointment was not confirmed. 

Samuel Benton was buried at Griffin, Georgia, and reinterred after the war in Hillcrest Cemetery in Holly Springs, Mississippi. He was survived by his wife, the former Rowena Knox, and a child.

Benton County, Mississippi, established in 1870, was named for Samuel Benton.

See also
Thomas Hart Benton, his uncle
List of American Civil War generals (Acting Confederate)

Notes

References
 Confederate Veteran Magazine, Vol. XI, No. 3, May–June 1992
 Eicher, John H., and David J. Eicher, Civil War High Commands. Stanford: Stanford University Press, 2001. .
 Rowland, Dunbar. "Military History of Mississippi, 1803-1898"
 Sifakis, Stewart. Who Was Who in the Civil War. New York: Facts On File, 1988. .
 Warner, Ezra J. Generals in Gray: Lives of the Confederate Commanders. Baton Rouge: Louisiana State University Press, 1959. .

1820 births
1864 deaths
Confederate States Army brigadier generals
People of Tennessee in the American Civil War
People of Mississippi in the American Civil War
People from Holly Springs, Mississippi
Confederate States of America military personnel killed in the American Civil War
Burials at Hillcrest Cemetery